was a Japanese baseball player.

He played the first half of his career for the Nippon-Ham Fighters in Japan's Nippon Professional Baseball. He was also the pitching coach for the Japan national baseball team at the 2006 World Baseball Classic.

References 

1965 births
Living people
Baseball people from Tokyo
Meiji University alumni
Japanese baseball players
Nippon Professional Baseball pitchers
Nippon Ham Fighters players
Fukuoka Daiei Hawks players
Chunichi Dragons players
Yomiuri Giants players